House of Councillors elections were held in Japan on July 21, 2013 to elect the members of the upper house of the National Diet. In the previous elections in 2010, the Democratic Party of Japan (DPJ) remained the largest party, but the DPJ-led ruling coalition lost its majority. The House of Councillors is elected by halves to six year terms. In 2013, the class of Councillors elected in 2007 was up.

Background
Japan had been in a "twisted parliament" (nejire kokkai, ねじれ国会) situation since 2007, in which opposite parties/coalitions control the houses of the Diet of Japan (government lower house majority, opposition upper house majority), leading to political paralysis on a number of issues. Shinzo Abe led the Liberal Democratic Party to victory in the December 2012 general election after several years in the opposition. In campaigning to win control of the House of Councillors, Abe sought to resolve the "twisted parliament" problem for the next three years.

Just prior to the election, the U.S. dollar fell against the yen on expectations of more momentum for Prime Minister Shinzo Abe's aggressive monetary easing to fight deflation and boost growth for the export-dominant economy of Japan. Abe's LDP and its coalition partner, the New Komeito party, were tipped to win a majority and end years of parliamentary stalemate so as to enable economic reforms. However, his critics suggested that a strong mandate could even make Abe complacent.

Opinion polling 

In the run-up to the election, various organizations conducted opinion polls to gauge voting intentions for the 48 proportional seats. Polls are listed in chronological order, showing the oldest first.

Note: U/O - Undecided or other

 Cabinet approval and disapproval ratings

Pre-election composition 
Note: Composition as of July 13, 2013.

Results
The ruling coalition won 76 seats and now holds a total of 135 seats in the House of Councillors ending the divided Diet.

Of the 31 single-member districts the LDP won 29; only in Iwate and Okinawa, opposition incumbents could hold their seats. The ten two-member districts elected ten LDP and ten opposition members; in several prefectures the second seat went to parties other than the DPJ: In Hyōgo to the JRP, in Miyagi to YP and in Kyōto to the JCP. Twelve of the 22 seats in three-, four and five-member districts went to LDP and Kōmeitō candidates. In the nationwide proportional race, the coalition parties won 25 seats, the opposition parties 23.

Summary

Differences between party and parliamentary group membership in the post-election opening session: Two independents caucus with the NRP, President Masaaki Yamazaki (LDP – Fukui), Vice-President Azuma Koshiishi (DPJ – Yamanashi) and Keiko Itokazu (OSMP – Okinawa) are independents in terms of parliamentary group.

Results by electoral district 
Abbreviations and translations used in this table for (nominating – endorsing) parties:
 L – Liberal Democratic Party
 D – Democratic Party
 K – Kōmeitō
 C - Japanese Communist Party
 S – Social Democratic Party
 I – Independent
 Ishin – Japan Restoration Association (Nippon Ishin no Kai)
 Minna – Your Party (Minna no Tō)
 PLP – People's Life Party
 Daichi – New Party Daichi
 Mikaze – Green Wind (Midori no kaze)
 Midori – Greens Japan (Midori no tō gurīnzu japan)
 OS – Okinawa Socialist Mass Party
 NRP – New Renaissance Party
 HRP – Happiness Realization Party
 LF/TPJ (in reference to vacant seats) – People's Life First (LF) members of the House of Councillors who resigned from or lost their seats in late 2012 to contest the House of Representatives election as candidates for the Tomorrow Party of Japan (TPJ)

References

External links
realpolitics.jp: Long-term monthly cabinet and party approval rates, overview of polls from various news organizations 
Yomiuri Shimbun: Results 
Asahi Shimbun: Results 
Ministry of Internal Affairs and Communications: Full results (pdf, 88 pages) 

Japan
2013 elections in Japan
House of Councillors (Japan) elections
July 2013 events in Japan